The 1971 Baylor Bears football team represented the Baylor University in the 1971 NCAA University Division football season. The Bears offense scored 74 points, while the Bears defense allowed 236 points. In the Battle of the Brazos, Texas A&M beat the Bears by a score of 10–9.

Schedule

References

Baylor
Baylor Bears football seasons
Baylor Bears football